"You Complete Me" is R&B song by American singer-songwriter Keyshia Cole. It is the second single from Keyshia Cole's third studio album A Different Me. Its music video ranked at No. 21 on BET's Notarized: Top 100 Videos of 2009 countdown.

Chart performance
"You Complete Me" charted on the U.S. Billboard  Hot R&B/Hip-Hop Songs and has so far peaked at number 7. It also peaked on the U.S. Billboard Hot 100 at number 62. The song has become a bigger hit than the previous single, the song became her fifteenth chart entry on the Hot 100 chart and her ninth consecutive top ten hit on the Hot R&B/Hip-Hop Songs chart.

Charts

Weekly charts

Year-end charts

References

2009 singles
Keyshia Cole songs
Music videos directed by Benny Boom
Song recordings produced by Theron Feemster
Contemporary R&B ballads
Soul ballads
Songs written by Theron Feemster
2008 songs
Song recordings produced by Ron Fair
Songs written by Keyshia Cole
Geffen Records singles
2000s ballads